The Savage Cup is the trophy that is awarded to British Columbia’s senior ice hockey champions.
This trophy was first presented in 1912-13 to the ice hockey team fielded by the Vancouver Rowing Club.
and the Savage Cup will be awarded to the BC provincial champions for the 2009-10 season.

Historically the Savage Cup winner was advanced directly to the Allan Cup playoffs, with the first playoff game against the Alberta champions.
Over time, provincial senior hockey leagues became less common in Canada; starting with the 2009-10 season, the Savage Cup is awarded to the top British Columbia team at the Allan Cup.

Savage Cup winners
The following teams have won the Savage Cup:

1912-13 - Vancouver Rowing Club
1913-14 - Fraser Mills Hockey Club
1914-15 - Vancouver B.B. Hockey Club
1915-16 - Vancouver B.B. Hockey Club
1916-17 - Vancouver Towers
1917-18 - Vancouver Towers
1918-19 - Vancouver Towers
1919-20 - Vancouver Towers
1920-21 - University of British Columbia
1921-22 - Vancouver Towers
1922-23 - Vancouver Young Liberals
1923-24 - Rossland Hockey Club
1924-25 - Rossland Hockey Club
1925-26 - Vancouver Towers
1926-27 - Trail Smoke Eaters
1927-28 - Trail Smoke Eaters
1928-29 - Trail Smoke Eaters
1929-30 - Trail Smoke Eaters
1930-31 - Trail Smoke Eaters
1931-32 - Trail Smoke Eaters
1932-33 - Trail Smoke Eaters
1933-34 - Kimberley Dynamiters
1934-35 - Kimberley Dynamiters
1935-36 - Kimberley Dynamiters
1936-37 - Nelson Maple Leafs
1937-38 - Trail Smoke Eaters
1938-39 - Kimberley Dynamiters
1939-40 - Trail Smoke Eaters
1940-41 - Trail Smoke Eaters
1941-42 - Kimberley Dynamiters
1942-43 - Victoria Army
1943-44 - New Westminster
1944-45 - No Competition
1945-46 - Trail Smoke Eaters
1946-47 - Kimberley Dynamiters
1947-48 - Trail Smoke Eaters
1948-49 - Trail Smoke Eaters
1949-50 - Kamloops Elks
1950-51 - Nanaimo Clippers
1951-52 - Trail Smoke Eaters
1952-53 - Penticton V's
1953-54 - Penticton V's
1954-55 - Vernon Canadians
1955-56 - Vernon Canadians
1956-57 - Spokane Flyers
1957-58 - Kelowna Packers
1958-59 - Vernon Canadians
1959-60 - Trail Smoke Eaters
1960-61 - Nelson Maple Leafs
1961-62 - Trail Smoke Eaters
1962-63 - No Competition
1963-64 - Kimberley Dynamiters
1964-65 - Nelson Maple Leafs
1965-66 - Kimberley Dynamiters
1966-67 - Nelson Maple Leafs
1967-68 - Spokane Jets
1968-69 - Spokane Jets
1969-70 - Spokane Jets
1970-71 - Nelson Maple Leafs
1971-72 - Spokane Jets
1972-73 - Spokane Jets
1973-74 - Cranbrook Royals
1974-75 - Spokane Flyers
1975-76 - Spokane Flyers
1976-77 - Spokane Flyers
1977-78 - Kimberley Dynamiters
1978-79 - Trail Smoke Eaters
1979-80 - Spokane Flyers
1980-81 - Quesnel Kangaroos
1981-82 - Cranbrook Royals
1982-83 - Trail Smoke Eaters
1983-84 - Spokane Chiefs
1984-85 - Spokane Chiefs
1985-86 - Nelson Maple Leafs
1986-87 - Nelson Maple Leafs
1987-88 - Elk Valley Blazers
1988-89 - No Competition
1989-90 - No Competition
1990-91 - Abbotsford Flyers
1991-92 - Abbotsford Flyers
1992-93 - Whitehorse Huskies
1993-94 - Penticton Silver Bullets
1994-95 - Powell River Regals
1995-96 - Powell River Regals
1996-97 - Powell River Regals
1997-98 - Powell River Regals
1998-99 - Powell River Regals
1999-00 - Powell River Regals
2000-01 - Powell River Regals
2001-02 - Powell River Regals
2002-03 - Powell River Regals
2003-04 - Trail Smoke Eaters
2004-05 - Powell River Regals
2005-06 - Powell River Regals
2006-07 - Fort St. John Flyers
2007-08 - Fort St. John Flyers
2008-09 - Fort St. John Flyers
2009-10 - Fort St. John Flyers

References

External links
BC Hall of Fame: History of Hockey in British Columbia

Senior ice hockey
Canadian ice hockey trophies and awards
Ice hockey in British Columbia
British Columbia awards